Yuncheng Zhangxiao Airport  is an airport serving the city of Yuncheng in Shanxi Province, China.  It is located in Zhangxiao Village, Taocun Town, 11 kilometers northeast of the city center, and is also mistakenly called Yuncheng Guangong Airport, referring to Guan Gong, a revered hero of ancient China who was from the Yuncheng area. In 2010 Yuncheng Airport served more than 600,000 passengers, ranking 62nd among all airports in China.

History
The airport was opened in February 2005, and expansion was started in May 2007 and completed in August 2008, with a total investment of 350 million yuan.  On 9 May 2012, a new 25,000 square-meter terminal building was opened, ten times the size of the original building.

Facilities
Yuncheng Airport has a runway that is 3000 meters long and 60 meters wide (class 4D), and seven aircraft parking aprons.  It has a 25,000 square-meter terminal building that was opened in May 2012.  It is designed to serve 1.2 million passengers and 8000 tons of cargo per year, with a peak capacity of 875 passengers per hour.

Airlines and destinations

Yuncheng Zhangxiao Airport is served by the following airlines:

See also
List of airports in China
List of the busiest airports in China

References

Airports in Shanxi
Airports established in 2005
2005 establishments in China